Charde Lakishia Houston (born April 10, 1986) is a professional basketball player in the WNBA, last played for the New York Liberty.

Born in Oceanside, California, Houston played high school basketball at San Diego High from 2000 to 2004, where she set the California state scoring record of 3,837 points.  After becoming the first in her family to graduate high school in 2004, Houston signed a letter of intent to play college basketball at UConn.  Houston graduated in 2008 with a degree in sociology.

Following her collegiate career, she was selected in the 3rd round (30th overall) of the 2008 WNBA Draft by the Minnesota Lynx.

Houston was signed by the WNBA's New York Liberty in June 2014 after spending the previous season with the Phoenix Mercury.

USA Basketball

Houston was a member of the USA Women's U18 team which won the gold medal at the FIBA Americas Championship in Mayaguez, Puerto Rico. The event was held in August 2004, when the USA team defeated Puerto Rico to win the championship. Houston helped the team win the gold medal, scoring 10.4 points per game.

Houston played for the USA team in the 2007 Pan American Games in Rio de Janeiro, Brazil. The team won all five games, earning the gold medal for the event.

WNBA career statistics

Regular season

|-
| align="left" | 2008
| align="left" | Minnesota
| 33 || 0 || 17.6 || .492 || .000 || .741 || 3.7 || 0.8 || 0.9 || 0.4 || 1.7 || 8.8
|-
| align="left" | 2009
| align="left" | Minnesota
| 34 || 33 || 23.3 || .465 || .333 || .727 || 5.5 || 1.7 || 1.3 || 0.6 || 1.9 || 13.1
|-
| align="left" | 2010
| align="left" | Minnesota
| 34 || 8 || 22.3 || .416 || .365 || .704 || 4.1 || 1.4 || 1.3 || 0.6 || 2.0 || 11.8
|-
|style="text-align:left;background:#afe6ba;"|  2011†
| align="left" | Minnesota
| 27 || 0 || 7.8 || .365 || .261 || .750 || 1.7 || 0.5 || 0.3 || 0.1 || 0.8 || 2.9
|-
| align="left" | 2012
| align="left" | Phoenix
| 27 || 20 || 25.7 || .408 || .348 || .723 || 3.4 || 1.6 || 1.3 || 0.4 || 1.9 || 12.0 
|-
| align="left" | 2013
| align="left" | Phoenix
| 34 || 6 || 17.2 || .400 || .180 || .778 || 2.3 || 1.3 || 0.5 || 0.4 || 1.6 || 5.9
|-
| align="left" | 2014
| align="left" | New York
| 17 || 0 || 8.4 || .451 || .125 || .692 || 1.0 || 0.6 || 0.5 || 0.4 || 0.9 || 3.3
|-
| align="left" | Career
| align="left" | 7 years, 3 teams
| 206 || 67 || 18.3 || .433 || .320 || .731 || 3.3 || 1.2 || 0.9 || 0.4 || 1.6 || 8.7

Playoffs

|-
|style="text-align:left;background:#afe6ba;"|  2011†
| align="left" | Minnesota
| 2 || 0 || 6.0 || .375 || .000 || .000 || 2.0 || 0.5 || 0.5 || 0.5 || 0.0 || 3.0
|-
| align="left" | 2013
| align="left" | Phoenix
| 5 || 0 || 4.4 || .357 || .200 || .000 || 1.0 || 0.0 || 0.2 || 0.2 || 0.2 || 2.2
|-
| align="left" | Career
| align="left" | 2 years, 2 teams
| 7 || 0 || 4.9 || .364 || .167 || .000 || 1.3 || 0.1 || 0.3 || 0.3 || 0.1 || 2.4

University of Connecticut statistics

Awards and achievements
 2009 WNBA All-Star Selection

See also
 2008 WNBA Draft
 List of Connecticut women's basketball players with 1000 points

Notes

External links
WNBA Player Profile
WNBA Prospect Profile

1986 births
Living people
American expatriate basketball people in France
American women's basketball players
Basketball players at the 2007 Pan American Games
Basketball players from California
Forwards (basketball)
McDonald's High School All-Americans
Minnesota Lynx draft picks
Minnesota Lynx players
New York Liberty players
Pan American Games gold medalists for the United States
Pan American Games medalists in basketball
Parade High School All-Americans (girls' basketball)
Phoenix Mercury players
Sportspeople from Oceanside, California
Tarbes Gespe Bigorre players
UConn Huskies women's basketball players
Women's National Basketball Association All-Stars
Medalists at the 2007 Pan American Games
United States women's national basketball team players
San Diego High School alumni